The Spyros Kyprianou Athletic Center (Greek: Αθλητικό Κέντρο "Σπύρος Κυπριανού"), also known as Spyros Kyprianou Sports Centre, Spyros Kyprianou Arena and Palais des sports, is an indoor arena located in Kato Polemidia, a district of Limassol in Cyprus. Opened in late 2005, it is named after the late president of Cyprus, Spyros Kyprianou.

History

This project was conducted by the Cyprus Sports Organisation and was constructed north of the city of Limassol near Kato Polemidia and by the side of LimassolTroodos road. Construction of the project began in late 2002 and was completed at the end of 2005 at a total cost of approximately CY£8.5 million.

Events
The centre already hosted major sports events like the FIBA Europe all-star game in 2006 and 2007. It also played host to the Cyprus Rally headquarters in 2005 and 2006. The arena itself hosted the media and rally organisers while the parking lot was the area for the competing WRC teams.

The arena hosted the Junior Eurovision Song Contest 2008. The shuttle of the centre can host more than 6,255 spectators and at least 42 wheelchair spots. Moreover, the centre is used especially for the sport events of local schools in Limassol greater area.

The arena will host one group stage of the 2025 FIBA EuroBasket. For that purpose, plans to expand the arena's capacity from 6,700 to a 9,600 seater have been approved.

References

External links

Official website

Athletics (track and field) venues in Cyprus
Basketball venues in Cyprus
Sports venues in Cyprus
Indoor arenas in Cyprus
Music venues in Cyprus
Nea Salamis Famagusta VC
Buildings and structures in Limassol District